The Type 21 frigate, or Amazon-class frigate, was a British Royal Navy general-purpose escort that was designed in the late 1960s, built in the 1970s and served throughout the 1980s into the 1990s.

Development
While the Royal Navy's warships were traditionally designed by the Ministry of Defence's Ship Department based at Bath, private shipyards (in particular Vosper Thorneycroft) campaigned for the right to design and build a ship to meet this requirement. Vospers claimed that, by ignoring what they claimed to be the conservative design practices followed by the MoD team at Bath, they could deliver the new frigate at a significantly lower price (£3.5 million compared with the £5 million price of the contemporary ), while being attractive to export customers.

The class was ordered under political and Treasury pressure for a relatively cheap, yet modern, general purpose escort vessel which would be attractive to governments and officers of South America and Australasia: the traditional export markets of British shipyards. It was also envisaged as an out-of-area RN gunboat that would retain UK presence in those areas, as well as the Caribbean and the Persian Gulf; essentially replacing the diesel-powered Type 41s and Type 61s and the combined steam and gas-powered  Type 81 frigates with smaller crewed vessels. The RN staff disliked the idea and would have preferred, like many USN Admirals, to continue to develop steam types - in the RN's case, the Type 12I Leander class, which was regarded as an especially successful and quiet anti-submarine hunter, but was seen by the politicians as dated and by the Treasury and export-oriented shipyards as too expensive to market.

When plans for the new  were finalised in 1968, the Admiralty board accepted that its paper specifications were unanswerable and they would have to allow the shipyards to develop a low cost fill in anti-submarine warfare and general purpose version for the RN that would be stretched and fully gas turbine-powered rather than combined diesel and gas like the Mk 5 and Mk 7. In reality, it was a much more difficult design, with the RN requiring the extra internal weight of the Computer Assisted Action Information System (CAAIS) computer command systems and the lack of heavy diesels or a steam plant low in the hull to balance the heavy top weight of CAAIS. The fitting of Tyne gas turbines for cruising, instead of the diesels used in the Iranian and Libyan versions, meant fuel consumption and cost would be high, which was a tremendous problem for the Royal Navy in the early 1980s when the austerity of early Thatcherism cut the Royal Navy fuel allowance and meant that most frigates spent more time tied up, rather than at sea in 1980–1981; and despite the smaller crew, running costs of the Type 21 were ten percent higher than those of the Leanders.

The Type 21 would provide the shipyards with experience in building fully gas turbine powered ships and provide them with useful work for the shipyards while the Type 42 destroyer and Type 22 frigate would not be ready until the mid-to-late 1970s. As the Admiralty design board were busy with the latter, the Type 21 project was given to the private shipyards of Vosper Thornycroft and Yarrow. The unmistakably yacht-like and rakish lines were indicative of their commercial design. Their handsome looks combined with their impressive handling and acceleration prompted the class nickname of "Porsches".  Not surprisingly,  the captains of these ships became known as "the boy racers"

At one stage, it was hoped to build a joint design that would meet both the Royal Navy's requirement for a low-cost Patrol Frigate and Australia's General Purpose Escort requirement, with discussions between the two navies beginning in 1967, with Australia, who hoped to build a series of Type 21s in Australian shipyards, part-funding design work on the proposal. The requirements of the two navies were significantly different, with Australia wanting higher speeds ( rather than the  requirement of the Royal Navy) and American armament (including Sea Sparrow missiles and a  Mark 45 gun).  Australia pulled out of the project in November 1968, later refining its requirements into the Australian light destroyer project. After the Royal Australian Navy (RAN) DDL was cancelled the RAN and Royal New Zealand Navy (RNZN) reconsidered the Type 21 but still found it too expensive, and considered the UK gun and radar inferior to the United States Navy options. Australia ordered the US  design in 1976.

A contract for detailed design of the new frigate to meet Royal Navy requirements and to build the first example was placed in March 1969. By this time cost had crept up to £7.3 million, more than Leander-class frigates.

Attempts continued to sell frigates derived from the Type 21 to export customers, including Argentina. A broad-beam derivative armed with vertical-launch Sea Wolf surface-to-air missiles was offered to Pakistan in 1985.

The first of the eight built, entered service in May 1974.

Design
These ships were the Royal Navy's first privately designed warships for many years. They were also the first design to enter service with the Royal Navy to be solely powered by gas-turbine engines, with two Rolls-Royce Tynes for cruising and two Rolls-Royce Olympus for high speeds arranged in a combined gas or gas (COGOG) arrangement. The design made use of large amounts of aluminium alloy in the superstructure to reduce the topweight. Worries later surfaced about its resilience to fire, particularly following a major fire on Amazon in 1977 during which aluminium ladders distorted, preventing fire-fighting teams from reaching the blaze, and its ability to withstand blast damage. Later warships reverted to using steel.

As delivered, the Type 21s were armed with a single 4.5 inch Mark 8 naval gun forward, and a four-round launcher for the SeaCat surface-to-air missile aft. The Italian Selenia Orion-10X lightweight fire control radar was adopted to control both the gun and the SeaCat missile (as the GWS-24 system) in an effort to save weight. A Type 992Q air/surface radar was fitted, but a long-range air-search radar was not provided. A hangar and flight deck were provided for a single helicopter, at first the Westland Wasp. The CAAIS was provided to integrate the ship's weapons and sensor systems and provide the crew with all the relevant information they required to fight the ship, as and when they needed it.

In terms of automation, systems integration and habitability, they were well in advance of many of the ships that they replaced, such as the Type 81 (Tribal-class) frigate and Type 12M  - the latter's basic design could be traced back to 1945.

Modifications
When they entered service, the Type 21s were criticized for being under-armed in relation to their size and cost. A programme was put in hand to increase their firepower by fitting four French-built MM38 Exocet anti-ship missiles. These were sited in front of the bridge screen aft of the forecastle, displacing the Corvus countermeasure launchers to amidships. This improvement was quickly carried out to all ships of the class during their build period except Amazon, Antelope and Ambuscade; Amazon and Ambuscade were fitted with Exocet in 1984/85. The Exocets were located in two pairs and the missiles would deploy across the ship and clear the opposite side of the vessel to their launchers in flight.

However, by the late 1970s it was clear the commercially designed Type 21 had 'insufficient margin' of weight and space when compared to the allowances customary in in-house Royal Navy warship designs for major modernization of the type being applied to the broad-beam Leander frigates, which included the replacement of the subsonic Seacat missiles with anti-missile Sea Wolf missiles to counter Soviet anti-ship missiles and the fitting of the Type 2016 bow sonar. The Type 21 could be fitted with either the 2016 sonar or Sea Wolf but not both. Five modernization proposals for the Type 21s were considered by the Royal Navy but rejected by 1979, when it was 'reluctantly' decided not to modernize the class, and it was estimated that they would be laid up by 1988.

The small Wasp helicopter was replaced by the vastly more capable Westland Lynx when it became available. Compared to the Wasp, the Lynx was faster and carried its own sensors, plus more and better weapons. As and when ships came in for refit, ship-launched anti-submarine torpedoes were also fitted (though not in Amazon), in the form of two STWS-1 triple-tube launchers capable of firing United States USN/NATO-standard Mark 44 or Mark 46 torpedoes. After the Falklands War, two more 20 mm Oerlikon guns were mounted on some ships of the class, one each side of the hangar, to provide extra close-in armament. The first of these guns was actually salvaged from the wreck of Antelope by divers, and was fitted to Avenger, where it carried the slogan 'Antelope's Avenger' on its gunshield.

Analysis
Criticism was levelled at the performance of the type in the Falklands conflict. The ships developed cracks in their decks due to the different expansion properties of steel and aluminium. This was a vulnerability particularly demonstrated under the severe weather conditions that they encountered in the South Atlantic. Steel reinforcing plates were eventually fitted down the sides of the ships. Although built to an exacting budget and design specification (and although carrying obsolete anti-aircraft weaponry), they distinguished themselves in a theatre for which they had not been designed. As shore bombardment platforms and in lethal, accurate gunfire support for the Royal Marines and British Army landing at San Carlos, they were superb, pinning down any possibility of Argentine army counterattack, but they remained shallow water surface fighting ships, designed for Vosper's export market to provide nations like Libya and Iran with the firepower to replace the United States / UK as western supporting stabilisers under the Kissinger / Healy strategy. The lack of margin to accept the Type 2031 towed array sealed the fate of the class.

This was important at a time when the Royal Navy was facing a manpower shortage. The standard of accommodation for the officers was better than the RN average and the senior ratings enjoyed separate cabins – unlike the petty officers of the Type 42 destroyer of the same era, who slept in bunk rooms. The ratings' accommodation was also improved, with four-man sleeping berths leading off from the communal mess deck; again, far better than those of the Type 42 destroyer. In essence, the standard of accommodation and fitting were better, especially for officers, because it was a design intended to attract export orders. It is very little more than a stretched version of the MK 7 Vospers frigate built for Libya and, other than the fitting of CAAIS, with its electronic and intended weapon fit essentially the same as the Mk 7 prototype in type or level of sophistication. In the Type 21, higher automation and the new Mk 8 4.5-inch automatic gun combined with an electronic fit that was in many ways simpler than that of the Leanders or Type 42. The Type 21 class lacked both the long range Type 965 radar carried by most UK warships and the Limbo mortar with its associated sonar. Inevitably, that meant a much smaller crew than the Leanders, with little capability to modernise (owing to its small size) and already being close to its topweight limit; the Type 21's days were numbered. A decision not to modernise them was made in 1979 even before the Falklands losses.

Service
Except for HMS Amazon, all the class took part in the 1982 Falklands War as the 4th Frigate Squadron. They were heavily involved, performing extensive shore-bombardment missions and providing anti-submarine and anti-aircraft duties for the task force. On 10 May, HMS Alacrity and Arrow probed through Falkland Sound at night searching for minefields that might have impeded landings and operations, almost as expendable hulls. Alacrity engaged and sank an Argentine naval supply vessel in the Sound. On exiting the Sound at daybreak, they were attacked by the Argentine submarine San Luis, which fired two torpedoes; one hit Arrows submarine towed decoy (as intended) and the other bounced off her hull, having failed to arm itself. Two ships were lost:  was hit by bombs dropped by Argentine aircraft on 21 May and consumed by fire;  was hit by bombs on 23 May, one of which was set off by the bomb disposal team attempting to defuse it on 24 May, causing the ship to catch fire and setting off her magazines, resulting in her breaking her back and sinking.

Sale to Pakistan
The six surviving Type 21 frigates were sold to Pakistan in 1993–1994 for 60 million US dollars. The Exocet and Seacat were removed before the sale and the frigates were given a basic refit at Karachi with US Harpoon anti-ship missile. Three of them were fitted with Phalanx CIWS, the others with 40mm Bofors L70 guns. Only two of the six remain in service: Badr and Babur were both decommissioned in 2014, while Tippu Sultan and Shah Jahan were sunk as targets in 2020 and 2021 respectively. By the closing years of the class the Harpoon was generally seen as slow and obsolete and in 2008 Harpoon was removed from the  Royal Navy frigates. The Pakistan frigates were given the Chinese 6-cell LY-60N Hunting Eagle surface-to-air missile system.

Ships

Running costs

The Type 21 Club 
In 2010, like-minded former crew members decided that an association should be formed for former shipmates and officers who ever served on these frigates. It also includes Pakistan Naval crew members of the frigates now part of the Pakistan navy.

See also
List of naval ship classes in service

Notes

Bibliography

 Couhat, Jean Labayle and A.D. Baker. Combat Fleets of the World 1986/87. Annapolis, Maryland, USA: Naval Institute Press, 1986. .
 Friedman, Norman. British Destroyers & Frigates: The Second World War and After. Barnsley, UK: Seaforth Publishing, 2008. .
 Gardiner, Robert and Stephen Chumbley. Conway's All The World's Fighting Ships 1947–1995. Annapolis, Maryland, USA: Naval Institute Press, 1995. .
 Marriott, Leo. Royal Navy Frigates 1945-1983 Ian Allan, 1983 .
 Moore, John E. Warships of the Royal Navy; New Edition, Jane's Publishing, 1981 .
 Preston, Antony. The World’s Worst Warships. London: Conway Maritime Press, 2002. .
 Lippiett, Capt. R.J. Type 21 - Modern Combat Ships 5 Ian Allan, 1990 .

Frigate classes
Ship classes of the Royal Navy